James Booth (1927–2005) was an English actor.

James Booth may also refer to:

James Booth (landscaper), Scottish landscaper, see Caspar Voght
James Booth (mathematician) (1806–1878), Irish cleric and educationist
James Booth (MP), Member of Parliament (MP) for Horsham
James Charles Booth (died 1778), English lawyer
James Curtis Booth (1810–1888), American chemist
James Scripps Booth (1888–1954), American automotive designer
James W. Booth (1822–1876), New York politician
James Booth (judge) (1914–2000), British judge and Liberal politician
James Booth Sr. (1753–1828), politician and judge in Delaware
James Booth Jr. (1789–1855), judge in Delaware
James Booth, character in 1994 Baker Street: Sherlock Holmes Returns

See also
James Boothe, character in Passions
James Booth Lockwood (1852–1884), American arctic explorer
George Formby Sr (James Lawler Booth, 1875–1921), English actor, singer and comedian